Urmas Laht (born 7 July 1955 in Loksa) is an Estonian politician. He was a member of IX Riigikogu.

He has been a member of Estonian Centre Party.

References

Living people
1955 births
Estonian Centre Party politicians
Members of the Riigikogu, 1999–2003
Estonian University of Life Sciences alumni
People from Loksa